Douglas Bennett (3 December 1894 – 3 March 1975) was an Australian rules footballer who played with Fitzroy in the Victorian Football League (VFL).

Notes

External links 

1894 births
1975 deaths
Australian rules footballers from Victoria (Australia)
Fitzroy Football Club players
Coburg Football Club players